Glenwood Public Library is the public library serving the city and surrounding area of Glenwood, Minnesota, United States.  The original wing of the building was constructed in 1908 as a Carnegie library and was listed on the National Register of Historic Places in 1982 for its local significance in architecture and education.  It was nominated to the National Register for being one of Pope County's most architecturally distinctive buildings and its only representative of the Carnegie library phenomenon.

See also
 National Register of Historic Places listings in Pope County, Minnesota

External links
 Glenwood Public Library Official Site
 Glenwood Public Library Facebook

References

1908 establishments in Minnesota
Buildings and structures in Pope County, Minnesota
Carnegie libraries in Minnesota
Libraries on the National Register of Historic Places in Minnesota
Library buildings completed in 1908
Neoclassical architecture in Minnesota
Public libraries in Minnesota
National Register of Historic Places in Pope County, Minnesota